The Latvia women's national under-20 basketball team is a national basketball team of Latvia, administered by the Latvian Basketball Association. It represents the country in women's international under-20 basketball competitions.

FIBA U20 Women's European Championship participations

FIBA Under-21 World Championship for Women participations

See also
Latvia women's national basketball team
Latvia women's national under-19 basketball team
Latvia men's national under-20 basketball team

References

External links
Archived records of Latvia team participations

Basketball in Latvia
Basketball
Women's national under-20 basketball teams